Halichoeres bicolor, or the pearly-spotted wrasse, is a species of salt water wrasse found in the Indo-West Pacific Ocean from Sri Lanka to the Indo-Malayan region.

Size

References

bicolor
Taxa named by Marcus Elieser Bloch
Taxa named by Johann Gottlob Theaenus Schneider
Fish described in 1801